Alfred Heinrich Ilg (30 March 1854 – 7 January 1916) was a Swiss engineer and First Minister of State to Ethiopian Emperor Menelik II. He was born in Frauenfeld, Switzerland and died in Zurich.

Early life 
In 1854, Ilg was born into a poor household in Frauenfeld. After his stepfather died, he began to train as a mechanic. Later he studied to become an engineer at the Federal Institute of Technology in Zürich. He was not so much interested in a career in Switzerland, but in a foreign country and after he became aware of a job in Abyssinia. Menelik II was inspired in hiring Alfred Ilg by the technical development Sudan made with help of the Swiss General Governor Werner Munzinger. Melinek preferred a Swiss technician, not one of a colonial power who he did not trust. The Swiss merchants of Furrer & Escher served as intermediaries between the two and in May 1878 Ilg left Zurich for Aden (present day Yemen). After having crossed the Red Sea on the African continent, he was detained four months in Zeila, Somalia. After his release, he traveled with camel forty-five days until he reached Ankobar on the 1 January 1879.

In Ethiopia 
He received a warm welcome by Melinek II who at the time was the King of Shewa. Ilg learned soon Amharic, and was involved in all sorts of technical issues. He built houses and waterworks or was involved in the construction of Addis Ababa.  A major work of his, was the construction of a bridge over the river Awash in 1886. But he was also entrusted diplomatic missions to Europe and once he also managed to get hold of a factory for ammunition production, which in the respect made Menelik independent from the colonial powers. Following, Menelik expanded his territory defeating the tribes to the east and southwards and after the Ethiopian Emperor Yohannes IV died in 1889, he became his successor. In 1897, Ethiopia and Italy agreed on the Treaty of Wuchale which made them to friends and allies and in which Italy assured to refrain from expanding into Ethiopian territory. In 1889, a slight adaption was made, in which Art. 17 of the Amharic version ensured Ethiopian sovereignty, while the Italian one made Ethiopia into an Italian protectorate. According to Helmut Stadler, this was pointed out to the Ethiopians by Alfred Ilg, who then sent him to Europe and inquire on the position of the other European powers. Ilg advised to prepare for war, when he learned Italy was planning an expedition into Ethiopia, attempting to force it to accept the Italian protectorate. In 1896, the Ethiopian army defeated the Italians at the Battle of Adwa and Italy acknowledged Ethiopian sovereignty in the Treaty of Addis Ababa.    

Menelik II rewarded Ilg with the title counselor in the range of an excellency in 1897 and, furthermore, named him minister of foreign affairs for the years 1897 to 1907. He showed his competence as an engineer when planning and implementing the railway line from Djibouti to the capital. He was also responsible for supervising the design and construction of the first piped water supply to the capital and for installing electrical power in the imperial palace in 1905. Ilg was leading in the construction of several public buildings and worked as chef de protcolle and secretary for the emperor, receiving the highest medal available, the Star of Ethiopia.

Further achievements worth mentioning are the creation of a unified national currency  system and the erection of a postal system. When Friedrich Rosen, an orientalist and leader of an official German delegation established several treaties between Ethiopia and Germany on 7 March 1905, Ilg's influence at court began to dwindle. He could not (or did not want to) do anything against several intrigues at court; which led to his resignation in 1907.

Later life 
Alfred Ilg returned to Switzerland and settled in Zürich where he died at the age of 61.

Ilg was a contemporary of the French poet Arthur Rimbaud, and was a frequent correspondent of him.

Exhibitions 
His collection of 300 Ethiopian artifacts which included pottery, weaponry or musical instruments was displayed in a variety of Swiss localities in 1891 and 1892. In 2003 it was again exhibited in the Ethnographic Museum in Zürich.

References

Bibliography
 Elisabeth Biasio: Prunk und Pracht am Hofe Menilek, Verl. NZZ, Zürich, 2004, 
 Conrad Keller: Alfred Ilg, sein Leben und sein Wirken als schweizerischer Kulturbote in Abessinien, Huber, Frauenfeld, 1918
 Heribert Küng: Staatsminister Alfred Ilg (1854–1916), ein Thurgauer am Hof Kaiser Menelik II. von Äthiopien, Thesis-Verl., Zürich, 1999, 
 Willi Loepfe: Alfred Ilg und die äthiopische Eisenbahn, Atlantis-Verl., Zürich, 1974, 
 Bairu Tafla (Hrsg.): Ethiopian records of the Menelik era, Harrassowitz, Wiesbaden, 2000, 
 Hugues Fontaine: Un Train en Afrique. African Train. Centre Français des Études Éthiopiennes / Shama Books. Édition bilingue français / anglais. Traduction : Yves-Marie Stranger. Postface : Jean-Christophe Belliard. Avec des photographies de Matthieu Germain Lambert et Pierre Javelot. Addis Abeba, 2012, .

Films 
Alfred Ilg - Der weiße Abessinier a film by Christoph Kühn (Switzerland, 2003)

External links 
 

1854 births
1916 deaths
Foreign ministers of Ethiopia
ETH Zurich alumni
Ethiopian courtiers of the 19th century
19th-century Swiss people
People from Frauenfeld
Swiss expatriates in Ethiopia